Killa Design Architecture is an architecture studio based in Dubai, United Arab Emirates. They are mainly known for the Museum of the Future. Killa Design are one of the leading architectural design firms in the region.

History
The firm was established by Shaun Killa in 2015 in Dubai. He has designed numerous projects including Marsa Al-Arab and Bahrain World Trade Center.

In 2015, Killa Design won the design competition for the Museum of the Future.

In 2016, the firm designed Office of the Future which was printed using additive manufacturing techniques. Later, they received Architecture Master Prize for their work.

In 2017, they designed The Address Beach Resort, a mix-use development project near Jumeirah Beach.

In April 2021, Killa Design received the Hospitality of the Year award for designing The Address Beach Resort project.

In December 2021, the firm received the Architecture Firm of the Year award.

Selected projects
 Museum of the Future
 Address Beach Resort
 Sheybarah
 Vida Dubai Marina & Yacht Club
 Marsa Al Arab Hotel
 Office of the Future
 Red Sea Boutique Resort
 SRG Tower
 Aykon Tower
 Sinuoso

References

Organisations based in Dubai